Pablo Nicolás Matera (born 18 July 1993) is an Argentine rugby union player who plays as a flanker for the Crusaders of Super Rugby. Previously, he played for Stade Français of the Top 14 League, the Leicester Tigers in England, the Pampas XV in the South African Vodacom Cup, and the Jaguares of Super Rugby. Matera has been a regular starter for Argentina since his debut in 2013, having played over 50 tests for his national team.

Club career

Leicester Tigers
In October 2013, five months after his international debut, English Premiership side Leicester Tigers signed 20-year-old Matera until the end of the 2013–14 season. He initially signed as an injury replacement for Tom Croft. Matera scored his first try for the club in round 16 of the 2013–14 season against the Newcastle Falcons in an 18–41 victory at Kingston Park, Newcastle.

Jaguares

2016
Matera signed for the Jaguares Argentina players, ahead of the 2016 Super Rugby season, after their inclusion in the competition. Matera received a yellow card thirty three minutes into the game against the Sharks at Kings Park Stadium in Durban. Matera scored his first and only try of the season in their fifth home game in round 15 against the Bulls, a 29–11 victory at the José Amalfitani Stadium in Buenos Aires.

2017–2018
Matera scored his first and only try for the Jaguares in the 2017 season against the Waratahs in a 27–40 away win at Allianz Stadium in Sydney.

Matera was named as captain of the Jaguares ahead of the 2018 season.

Stade Francais
Matera joined Stade in 2019.

International career
Matera represented Argentina U20 in the 2012 and 2013 U20 World Championships.

Matera made his senior debut for Los Pumas against Chile in May 2013 and was subsequently named in the squad for the 2013 Rugby Championship, where he featured in all the games of that campaign. Matera was a big feature for Argentina in the 2015 Rugby World Cup, playing six of seven games for Los Pumas and helping them finish fourth overall.

Matera played his 50th test for Los Pumas on 18 August 2018 against South Africa during round one on the 2018 Rugby Championship. The test was a 21–34 loss for Los Pumas, who bounced back to beat South Africa the following week. Despite Matera's good performances against South Africa, new head coach Mario Ledesma went on to bench Matera for the 8 September clash against New Zealand.

Matera was the Captain of the  national team, which on 14 November 2020 had their first ever win against the All Blacks.

On 30 November 2020, Matera was temporarily stripped of his captaincy and suspended from the national team.

International Tries 
As of 9 August 2022

Controversies
In November 2020, Los Pumas were criticised for not properly honouring the death of Diego Maradona in the game against the All Blacks, three days after his death. In the following days, several Twitter users found and shared racist messages published by Matera in his account. Matera's Twitter posts were made between seven and nine years earlier, when he was a teenager. In response, Matera deleted his social media accounts. He has since publicly apologised.

Both the Delegación de Asociaciones Israelitas Argentinas (DAIA) and the National Institute Against Discrimination, Xenophobia and Racism (INADI) heavily condemned Matera’s tweets.

Super Rugby statistics

References

1993 births
Living people
Rugby union players from Buenos Aires
Rugby union flankers
Pampas XV players
Leicester Tigers players
Jaguares (Super Rugby) players
Argentine rugby union players
Argentina international rugby union players
Argentine expatriate rugby union players
Argentine expatriate sportspeople in England
Expatriate rugby union players in England
Racism in Argentina
Antisemitism in Argentina
Stade Français players
Crusaders (rugby union) players
Mie Honda Heat players